Christopher Richard Swan (born 10 August 1978 in Southport, Queensland) is an Australian professional cricketer. He is a right-arm swing bowler who has played for the Queensland Bulls between 2006 and 2012.

Before playing first-class cricket, Swan played for the Gold Coast Dolphins in Queensland's grade cricket premiership. He once took nine wickets in an innings for the Dolphins and became the club's captain and coach. He made his debut for Queensland at the age of 28 in a four-day match against New South Wales in October 2006. Despite taking five wickets in the match, it would be more than a year before he played for Queensland again. Upon his recall to the Queensland side, in a limited overs match, he took four wickets for 24 runs and was named the man of the match. He subsequently earned a full-time contract with Queensland. His best bowling figures for Queensland are 7–75, while he has scored three half-centuries as a batsman. The 7–75 performance came in a four-day match against South Australia in November 2010 in which he took 13 wickets—the third best bowling performance in the Bulls' history. The performance followed Swan being dropped from the Bulls' team—he only played in the match after other bowlers withdrew from the team with injuries. His average score with the bat in first class cricket is over 20, while his bowling average is less than 26 runs for every wicket.

As a youngster, Swan represented Queensland in junior Australian rules football squads. Outside professional cricket, he works as a pest controller.

References

1978 births
Australian cricketers
Living people
Queensland cricketers
Brisbane Heat cricketers
Sportspeople from the Gold Coast, Queensland